Ahead of My Time is the fourth independent album (seventh overall) by rapper Lil' Flip, released on July 6, 2010.

Promotion
The first single from the album is "Heartbreaker", which features Eeden & Sean Thomas.

Videos
A video was released for "50 in My Pinkyrang" on July 17, 2010.

Another video was released for "Heartbreaker" on August 6, 2010.

Background
Ahead of My Time was originally set to be released as early as 2007, but was pushed back many times, and was finally released on July 6, 2010.

Lil' Flip released two "album-before-the-album's" in 2009 to help promote the release of Ahead of My Time.

The two albums were: Respect Me and Underground Legend 2.

Sales
Despite the extra promotion the album sold only 205 copies the first week it was available.

Track listing

References

2010 albums
Lil' Flip albums
Albums produced by Big Hollis